Sgt. Frog, also known as Sergeant Keroro and originally titled as Keroro Gunso, is a Japanese television series produced and animated by Sunrise Inc. The series centers around the attempted invasion of Earth by a Platoon of 5 frog-like aliens and the mishaps that their incompetent and lazy leader cause. Around them are the human figures that help them understand earth's culture. The anime is an adaptation of Mine Yoshizaki's manga series of the same name, which was first serialized in Japan's Shōnen Ace in 1999, and has been toned down for children instead of focusing on teenagers.

It first began airing in Japan on the television network TV Tokyo on April 3, 2004, and has since broadcast over 300 episodes, which are normally constituted from two 15 minute shorts mostly and sometimes one 30 minute story. The anime itself is divided by seasons with a duration of a year (51 episodes per season, one per week except for the first week of January), always starting and ending the first week of April. The title for each episode of the series always starts with the name of a character that becomes the episode's focus.

The first English dub of the show to be released was titled Sergeant Keroro and aired on the Southeast Asian TV channel Animax Asia. It premiered in 2008. In 2009, Funimation Entertainment released the second English dubbed version of the anime. Funimation's dub was released in North America, and has spanned a total of six 12 to 14-episode DVD sets, with the first four sets later released in two larger 25 to 26-episode box sets. To date, the first 78 episodes have been released in English by FUNimation.

Series overview

Episode list

Season 1 (2004–05)

Season 2 (2005–06)

Season 3 (2006–07)

Season 4 (2007–08)

Season 5 (2008–09)

Season 6 (2009–10)

Season 7 (2010–11)

Notes

References

External links
  Anime Newtype Channel (upcoming episodes)
  Keroro Gunsō website (upcoming episodes)
  TV Tokyo Keroro Gunsō website
  Keroro Gunsō schedule - Sunrise

Sgt. Frog